William Bradford (1719 – September 25, 1791) was a printer, soldier, and leader during the American Revolution from Philadelphia.

Bradford was born in New York City in 1719, and was the grandson of the printer William Bradford. He was apprenticed to (and later a partner of) his uncle Andrew Bradford in Philadelphia. This relationship ended in 1741. He visited England that year, returning in 1742 with equipment to open his own printing firm as well as a library.

Bradford was the publisher of The Pennsylvania Journal, the first number of which appeared on December 2, 1742. In later years each issue had the still-recognized image of the snake chopped into segments with the motto "Unite or Die". Variations of this logo were also used by Paul Revere, Benjamin Franklin, and others. In 1754 he also opened the London Coffee House in Philadelphia and began to write marine insurance. As a publisher and writer he attacked many policies of the British government, and was especially vocal in his opposition to the Stamp Act in 1765.

The first Continental Congress met in Philadelphia in 1774, and Bradford was named as the official printer for the Congress. In this role he printed the formal resolutions, broadsides, and documents such as the Declaration of Rights, that the Congress issued.

When the American Revolutionary War started, Bradford left his business in his son's hands and, despite being middle aged, went into active military service with the Pennsylvania militia. He was made a major, and later promoted to colonel. He saw action at Trenton and Princeton, at Fort Billingsport, and at Fort Mifflin. Because the wound he received at the battle of Princeton continued to trouble him, when British forces withdrew from Philadelphia he resigned from the militia and returned to the city.

His son Thomas had continued The Pennsylvania Journal during his absence. Now they became partners, and over the years expanded their publishing house. After William's death on September 25, 1791 Thomas continued their enterprise. A second son, William (sometimes called William, Jr.), joined the Continental Army, became a lawyer and was later Chief Justice of the Pennsylvania Supreme Court and U. S. Attorney General. Thomas's son Samuel Fisher Bradford continued the family tradition and is noted for the American printing of Rees's Cyclopædia.

The following obituary of Bradford was published in the Maryland Herald on October 11, 1791:

References

Further reading
.

External links

The Bradford Family Papers, including correspondence and other materials from 1620 to 1906, are available for research use at the Historical Society of Pennsylvania.

1719 births
1791 deaths
American people of English descent
Military personnel from New York City
People of the Province of New York
American printers
Pennsylvania militiamen in the American Revolution
18th-century American newspaper publishers (people)
18th-century printers
Colonial American printers